He Licheng is a Chinese individual artistic gymnast.

At the 2018 Junior Asian Championships in Jakarta, Indonesia, she won the gold medal as part of the Chinese team with Qi Qi, Tang Xijing, Yin Sisi, and Zhao Shiting .

In May 2021, following that year's Chinese nationals where she placed fifth in the all-around, she was named to the provisional Chinese Olympic squad.

References 

Living people
Chinese female artistic gymnasts
Year of birth missing (living people)